Aksel Agerby (29 May 1889 – 20 March 1942) was a Danish composer, organist, and music administrator. He also operated his own Music Publishing company, which published both his work and those of others.

Work 

Agerby was blind and was trained as an organist and pianist at the Danish Royal Blind Institute and the Copenhagen Organist School. From 1921, he was an organist at Copenhagen Funeral services and from 1930 until his death, he played the organ at Brønshøj Church. Today, he is chiefly remembered for one small piece of music, the melody for Jeg er havren. A few other songs of his were recorded, some with Aksel Schiøtz. His musical output also included some songs and a few instrumental compositions, sometimes backed up by an orchestra.

Most of his music was written for keyboard instruments; he also composed a number of works for choirs, as well as a handful of pieces for larger ensembles.

His legacy and importance to the Danish music scene lies elsewhere. He was an energetic and charismatic President of the DUT (the Young Musical Artists Society), which was, and continues to be, involved in the International Society for Contemporary Music. Agerby was chairman of the DUT from 1929 until his death, and had strong opinions and the ability to make things happen. He managed to execute a merger with the New Music (Ny Musik) Organization, thereby creating a more powerful association for contemporary music.

Compositions

Piano Music 
Jeg er havren (1916)
Spurvene ved Helliggejst
Jyske viser (10 songs)
Flammende ungdom
Jeg ved ej hvorfra du kommer
Majnat
Liljekonval
Vintergækker
En Dag
Vor mor
Hørvise
Hvide børn og sorte børn

Choral compositions 
Vor tid (mixed choir)
Glæde over foråret (male choir)
Danmark, kære mor (male choir)
Kløver (male choir)

Other compositions 
Intermezzo (oboe and orchestra)
Elegi (oboe and orchestra)
Intermezzo pastorale (violin and piano)
Humoreske (violin and piano)
Aftenvandring (orchestra)
Berceuse (violin and orchestra)

References
Danish: article in the DMT on the occasion of Agerby's 50th birthday

1889 births
1942 deaths
Danish classical composers
Danish male classical composers
Danish classical organists
Male classical organists
20th-century organists
20th-century Danish male musicians
Blind musicians